Niaz Zaman is a Bangladeshi translator and a supernumerary professor at the University of Dhaka. She was awarded 2016 Bangla Academy Literary Award in the translation category.

Education and career
Zaman completed her I.A. and B.A. from Holy Cross College and M.A. from the University of Dhaka. She joined Dhaka University as a lecturer of English in 1972. She founded her publishing house writers.ink in 2005. Zaman was affiliated to the Bangladesh Embassy in Washington, D.C. as Educational Attaché for around three years.

Awards
 Bangla Academy Literary Award (2017)
 Ananya Award (2013) 
 National Archives Award
 Asiaweek Short Story Award

Publications
The Confessional Art of Tennessee Williams
The Art of Kantha Embroidery
A Divided Legacy: The Partition in Selected Novels of India, Pakistan and Bangladesh
The Crooked Neem Tree
The Dance and Other Stories
Didima's Necklace and Other Stories
The Daily Woman

References

Living people
University of Dhaka alumni
Bengali–English translators
Academic staff of the University of Dhaka
Holy Cross College, Dhaka alumni
Recipients of Bangla Academy Award
Year of birth missing (living people)